Fischbach is a river of Bavaria, Germany and of Salzburg, Austria.

The source of the river lies in Austrian area. After , together with the Seetraun it forms the Weiße Traun in Ruhpolding's district Laubau.

See also
List of rivers of Bavaria

References

Rivers of Bavaria
Rivers of Salzburg (state)
Rivers of Austria
Rivers of Germany
International rivers of Europe